= Cape Ukoy =

Cape in the western Sea of Okhotsk

Coordinates: 55°38′N 136°46′E

Cape Ukoy (Russian: Mys Ukoy) is a steep, narrow cape in the western Sea of Okhotsk. It consists of high and prominent rocks. Ukoy Bay lies just west of the cape.

== History ==
American and Russian whaleships cruised for bowhead whales off the cape in the 1850s and 1860s. They also anchored off the cape to obtain wood and water.
